Platycerus oregonensis is a species of stag beetle, from the subfamily Lucaninae of family Lucanidae. It was discovered by John O. Westwood in 1844.

Geographical distribution 
It is found in North America.

References 

Lucanidae
Beetles described in 1844
Endemic fauna of Oregon